Afro rock is a style of rock music with West African influences. Afro rock bands and artists in the late 1960s and early 1970s included Osibisa, Assagai and Lafayette Afro Rock Band.

Style 
The style relies on the use of rock string instruments (electric guitars and electric bass) and guitar effects like wah wah pedal. Songs are based around a rock chordal structure and progression with a horn section, and keyed instruments such as electric piano, organ, and clavinet. The rhythmic elements of the music are drums and bass, but other characteristically African and Afro-Cuban elements are the percussion instruments including congas, bongos, claves, whistles and other Latin percussion. In the late 1960s, Super Eagles and Psychedelic Aliens were pioneers of the genre. Osibisa and Assagai were founded in England.

Afro rock musicians 
Osibisa
Assagai
Demon Fuzz
Blo
MATATA
Monomono
Remi Kabaka, drummer

References

See also 
Afrobeat
Manu Dibango
Fela Kuti
Alhaji K. Frimpong. Ghanaian highlife singer

20th-century music genres
African-American music in Africa
Rock music genres